is an electoral district in the House of Representatives of Japan. The district was established in 1994 as a single-member constituency.

The current Representative for the district is Junya Ogawa, a member of the CDP as well as former representative for the district from 2009 to 2012 as a member of the DPJ. Ogawa was previously a member of the Shikoku proportional representation district from 2005 to 2009, and then again from 2012 to 2021.

Areas Covered

Current District 
After the rezoning applied in 2022, the areas covered by this district are as follows:

 Takamatsu (city limits before the Great Heisei Consolidation)
 City Centre
 Busshozan and Katsuga 
 former town of Yamada
 districts of Mokuta, Furutakamatsu, Yashima, Maeda, Kawazoe, Enji and Danshi
 Islands of Megijima and Ogijima
 Shōzu District
 Kagawa District

Areas from 2017-2022 
After the 2017 redistricting, the areas covered by this district were as follows:

 Takamatsu (city limits before the Great Heisei Consolidation)
 City Centre
 Katsuga
 former town of Yamada
 districts of Tsuruo, Ota, Mokuta, Busshozan, Furutakamatsu, Yashima, Maeda, Kawazoe, Enji, Hayashi, Mitani, Ichinomiya, Tahi and Danshi
 Islands of Megijima and Ogijima
 Shōzu District
 Kagawa District

Areas from 2013-2017 
After the 2013 redistricting, the areas covered by the district were as follows:

 Takamatsu (city limits before the Great Heisei Consolidation)
 City Centre
 Katsuga
 former town of Yamada
 districts of Tsuruo, Ota, Mokuta, Busshozan, Furutakamatsu, Yashima, Tsuruchi, Kosai, Kinashi, Shimokasai, Maeda, Kawazoe, Enji, Hayashi, Mitani, Ichinomiya, Tahi and Danshi
 Islands of Megijima and Ogijima
 Shōzu District
 Kagawa District

Areas from before 2013 
From 1994 to the first rezoning in 2013, the areas covered by the district were as follows:

 Takamatsu
 Shōzu District 
 Kagawa District 
 Naoshima

Elected Representatives

Election Results 
‡ - Also ran in Shikoku PR district

‡‡ - ran and won in the Shikoku PR district

1

References

Related 

Districts of the House of Representatives (Japan)
Districts in Kagawa Prefecture
Politics of Kagawa Prefecture